The Shire of Perry was a local government area in the northern catchment of the Burnett River, Queensland, Australia.

Its administrative centre was the town of Mount Perry.

History

The Perry Division was one of the original divisions created under the Divisional Boards Act 1879 with a population of 1664.  It held its first meeting on 6 March 1880.

With the passage of the Local Authorities Act 1902, Perry Division became the Shire of Perry on 31 March 1903.

On 15 March 2008, under the Local Government (Reform Implementation) Act 2007 passed by the Parliament of Queensland on 10 August 2007, the Shire of Perry merged with the Shires of Biggenden, Eidsvold, Gayndah, Monto and Mundubbera to form the North Burnett Region.

Towns and localities
The Shire of Perry included the following settlement:

 Mount Perry

Population

Chairmen and mayors
 1902—1933: Robert Hodnett 
 1933: William John Maynard 
 2008: Joy Jensen

Joy Jensen was the last mayor of the Shire of Perry. Despite leading the smallest of the six North Burnett councils, she won the mayoralty of the new North Burnett Region at the elections on 15 March 2008.

References

Former local government areas of Queensland
1880 establishments in Australia
2008 disestablishments in Australia
Populated places disestablished in 2008